Canoiwala Mohra is a town in the Islamabad Capital Territory of Pakistan. It is located at 33° 24' 55N 73° 23' 40E with an altitude of 497 metres (1633 feet).

References 

Union councils of Islamabad Capital Territory